The 23rd  ceremony of the Forqué Awards was held on 13 January 2018 at the Palacio de Congresos in Zaragoza. The gala was hosted by Elena S. Sánchez and Boris Izaguirre.

History 
The nominations were disclosed in December 2017.

Broadcast on La 1, the ceremony was held at the Palacio de Congresos in Zaragoza on 13 January 2018.

Carlos Saura was gifted the EGEDA Gold Medal recognizing a career in the film industry.

Winners and nominees
The winners and nominees are listed as follows:

References

External links 
 Gala of the 23rd Forqué Awards on RTVE Play

Forqué Awards
2018 film awards
2018 in Spain
Zaragoza
January 2018 events in Spain